KZBL (100.7 FM) is a radio station broadcasting an oldies music format. Licensed to Natchitoches, Louisiana, United States, the station serves Natchitoches Parish and surrounding areas from a studio located in Natchitoches, Louisiana.  The station is owned by Baldridge-Dumas Communications, Inc. The station broadcasts the Westwood One' Good Time Oldies satellite-fed network programming.

Website
KZBL's website, www.kzblradio.com, was established in May, 2010.  It offers local weather conditions, world, state, and local news, events, and sports.  KZBL also offers live streaming audio of its programming, which began in October 2010.  KZBL's website also promotes its sister station, KDBH 97.5 FM.

History
KZBL started in 1986 as a 3,000 watt station near where it is located today. The station upgraded in power to its present 25,000 watts in 1999 before being sold to its current owners. The station applied for and received an allowance to move up the tower 9 meters (from 75 to 84 meters) in 2002 to help in coverage area.

References

External links
KZBL's Website

Oldies radio stations in the United States
Natchitoches Parish, Louisiana
Radio stations in Louisiana
Radio stations established in 1986
1986 establishments in Louisiana
Internet properties established in 2010